"José and his Amazing Technicolor Overcoat" is a comedy sketch first performed for Gift Grub on Ireland's Today FM.

Song
The skit parodies the musical Joseph and the Amazing Technicolor Dreamcoat (particularly the song "Any Dream Will Do", sung here as "Any Team Will Do") as well as Roma manager José Mourinho. It received media attention in the UK by becoming popular on online message boards and London's Capital Gold radio. Mourinho himself said he liked the skit and invited Irish impersonator Mario Rosenstock to a player's dinner to perform it. It reached #45 in the UK Singles Chart.

Follow-up
The song was followed up by I Sign a Little Player or Two. The sketch begins with a mock interview on Sky Sports involving José Mourinho and fellow football manager, Mick McCarthy.  After playing up to Mourinho's perceived "Special One" image, Mourinho concludes the interview and starts singing. Unlike the original song, this was not released as a single. YouTube has received over 1 million views of the 3 Mourinho mock songs.

Notes

External links
 Jose Mourinho Song Amazing Technicolour Overcoat at YouTube

2006 singles
Chelsea F.C.
Irish novelty songs
The Ian Dempsey Breakfast Show